Limnophis is a genus of snakes in the subfamily Natricinae of the family Colubridae. The genus contains three species.

Geographic range
Species of the genus Limnophis are endemic to southern Africa.

Species
The following three species are recognized as being valid.
Limnophis bangweolicus   — eastern striped swamp snake, Bangweulu water snake,
Limnophis bicolor  — bicolored swamp snake 
Limnophis branchi

References

Further reading
Günther A (1865). "Fourth Account of new Species of Snakes in the Collection of the British Museum". Ann. Mag. Nat. Hist, Third Series 15: 89-98 + Plates II-III. (Limnophis, new genus, p. 96).

Limnophis
Taxa named by Albert Günther
Snake genera